Water Canyon Administrative Site, in Apache-Sitgreaves National Forest near Springerville, Arizona, was built in 1933. It was listed on the National Register of Historic Places in 1993 for its architecture, which is Bungalow/Craftsman style. It was designed by architects of the United States Forest Service. It served historically as institutional housing and as government office space.

See also
 
 
 National Register of Historic Places listings in Apache County, Arizona

References

 Landmark

United States Forest Service architecture
Civilian Conservation Corps in Arizona
Park buildings and structures on the National Register of Historic Places in Arizona
Government buildings completed in 1933
Buildings and structures in Apache County, Arizona
Apache-Sitgreaves National Forests
1933 establishments in Arizona
National Register of Historic Places in Apache County, Arizona